The 1994–95 St. Francis Terriers men's basketball team represented St. Francis College during the 1994–95 NCAA Division I men's basketball season. The team was coached by Ron Ganulin, who was in his fourth year at the helm of the St. Francis Terriers. The Terrier's home games were played at the  Generoso Pope Athletic Complex. The team has been a member of the Northeast Conference since 1981.

The Terriers finished their season at 9–18 overall and 5–13 in conference play. The Terriers played as the 9th seed in the NEC Tournament and lost in the first round against 8th seed Saint Francis (PA), 76–95.

Roster

Schedule and results

|-
!colspan=12 style="background:#0038A8; border: 2px solid #CE1126;;color:#FFFFFF;"| Regular season

 
|-
!colspan=12 style="background:#0038A8; border: 2px solid #CE1126;;color:#FFFFFF;"| 1995 NEC tournament

|-

References

St. Francis Brooklyn Terriers men's basketball seasons
St. Francis
St. Francis Brooklyn Terriers men's basketball
St. Francis Brooklyn Terriers men's basketball